Moses Phiri (born 3 June 1993) is a Zambian football player who plays for Simba in Tanzania.

International career

International goals
Scores and results list Zambia's goal tally first.

Club career
He made his professional debut in the Segunda Liga for Académico de Viseu on 21 February 2016 in a game against Famalicão.

References

External links
 

1993 births
Sportspeople from Lusaka
Living people
Zambian footballers
National Assembly F.C. players
Zambia international footballers
Zanaco F.C. players
Académico de Viseu F.C. players
S.C. Covilhã players
Buildcon F.C. players
Zambian expatriate footballers
Expatriate footballers in Portugal
Liga Portugal 2 players
Zambian expatriate sportspeople in Portugal
Association football forwards
Zambia Super League players
2020 African Nations Championship players
Zambia A' international footballers
Zambian expatriate sportspeople in Tanzania
Simba S.C. players
Expatriate footballers in Tanzania